The 1947 PGA Championship was the 29th PGA Championship, held June 18–24 at Plum Hollow Country Club in Southfield, Michigan, a suburb northwest of Detroit. Jim Ferrier won the match play championship, 2 & 1 over Chick Harbert in the Tuesday final; the winner's share was $3,500 and the runner-up's was $1,500. The match was tied after the first round, and again after 22 holes. Ferrier won the next three and local resident Harbert could get no closer than two holes down for the rest of the match. It was the only major title for Ferrier, a naturalized U.S. citizen born in Australia.

Defending champion Ben Hogan was defeated 3 & 1 in the first round by Toney Penna, who was seven-under for the 17 holes, but then lost in the next round. Jimmy Demaret earned $250 as the medalist in the stroke play qualifier at 137 (−7), but was also eliminated in the first round. Sam Snead lost in the second round to three-time champion Gene Sarazen. Hogan regained the title the next year.

The last three majors were held within several weeks in 1947: the U.S. Open was concluded several days earlier in St. Louis, Missouri. Lew Worsham defeated Sam Snead by a stroke in an 18-hole playoff on Sunday, June 15. The British Open was played the first week of July in England.

This was the first PGA Championship scheduled to conclude on Tuesday, which continued through 1956. Two-time champion Byron Nelson did not compete; his final PGA Championship was the previous year.

Format
The match play format at the PGA Championship in 1947 called for 12 rounds (216 holes) in seven days:
 Wednesday and Thursday – 36-hole stroke play qualifier, 18 holes per day;
defending champion Ben Hogan and top 63 professionals advanced to match play
 Friday – first two rounds, 18 holes each
 Saturday – third round – 36 holes
 Sunday – quarterfinals – 36 holes
 Monday – semifinals – 36 holes
 Tuesday – final – 36 holes

Past champions in the field

Failed to qualify

Runyan did not advance in the eleven-way playoff for the one final spot in the match play field.
Source:

Final results
Tuesday, June 24, 1947

Final eight bracket

Final match scorecards
Morning

Afternoon

Source:

References

External links
PGA Media Guide 2012
PGA.com – 1947 PGA Championship

PGA Championship
Golf in Michigan
Southfield, Michigan
PGA Championship
PGA Championship
PGA Championship
PGA Championship